Glebe of Hungar's Parish is a historic glebe house located at Franktown, Northampton County, Virginia. It was built sometime between 1643 and 1745, and is a 1 1/2-story, brick, structure with gable roof, dormers, and two interior end chimneys. It was the official residence of the ministers of Hungar's Parish from 1745 until 1850.
The Glebe is not actually in Franktown but about 10 miles southwest on the shores of Chesapeake Bay.

It was listed on the National Register of Historic Places in 1970.

References

Properties of religious function on the National Register of Historic Places in Virginia
Houses in Northampton County, Virginia
National Register of Historic Places in Northampton County, Virginia